Evgeniya Alexandrovna Belyakova (born 27 June 1986) is a Russian professional basketball player. A professional since 2004, Belyakova plays for Russia women's national basketball team and competed in the 2012 Summer Olympics and three EuroBasket Women.

References

1986 births
Living people
Basketball players at the 2012 Summer Olympics
Los Angeles Sparks players
Olympic basketball players of Russia
Russian expatriate basketball people in the United States
Russian women's basketball players
Basketball players from Saint Petersburg
Shooting guards
Universiade medalists in basketball
Universiade silver medalists for Russia
Medalists at the 2009 Summer Universiade
Undrafted Women's National Basketball Association players